William John Tucker (born 17 May 1948) is an English former professional footballer who played in the Football League, as a central defender.

External links
Profile at ENFA

1948 births
Living people
Sportspeople from Kidderminster
English footballers
Association football defenders
Kidderminster Harriers F.C. players
Evesham United F.C. players
Hereford United F.C. players
Bury F.C. players
Swindon Town F.C. players
Cheltenham Town F.C. players
English Football League players